Gaisler's long-eared bat (Plecotus gaisleri) is a species of bat in the genus Plecotus. It is a medium-sized grayish-brown and found in Morocco, Algeria, Libya, and Tunisia.

Taxonomy
Plecotus gaisleri was described as a new subspecies of the Canary big-eared bat (P. teneriffae) in 2004 by Petr Benda, who gave it the trinomen of Plecotus teneriffae gaisleri. The eponym for the species name "gaisleri" was Jiří Gaisler, who "significantly contributed to the knowledge of the North African bat fauna". A 2007 study concluded that it should be considered a full species, P. gaisleri, based on the magnitude of genetic divergence.

Description

Biology and ecology
It is nocturnal, foraging for its prey at night or shortly before sunset. It mostly consumes large- and medium-sized moths, though also consumes some beetles and flies. Its reproduction is not well known, though it likely has a litter size of one individual, breeds seasonally, and has only one breeding season annually. Its predators include barn owls and Pharaoh eagle-owls.

Range and habitat
Plecotus gaisleri is known from areas of Libya with a Mediterranean climate. It is now additionally known from Morocco, Algeria, and Tunisia.

References

gaisleri
Mammals described in 2004
Bats of Africa